Jane Elizabeth "Jennie" Faulding Taylor (6 October 1843 – 31 July 1904), was a British Protestant missionary to China with the China Inland Mission. She pioneered the work of single women missionaries in China and eventually married the founder of the mission, James Hudson Taylor, after the death of his first wife, Maria Jane Dyer. As Taylor's wife, she assumed many roles within the mission agency when Taylor was overseas—acting at times as a home director for the mission. She encouraged women, both married and unmarried, to participate in the work of the China Inland Mission in ways that had previously only been reserved for male missionaries.

Early life in London

Jane Elizabeth Faulding was the daughter of a piano manufacturer in London. She was an 1865 graduate of the Home and Colonial Training College along with her friend, Emily Blatchley. She attended the weekly prayer meeting at the home of Hudson & Maria Taylor in the East End of London in 1865. She was influenced by the Taylors and their book: "China's Spiritual Need and Claims", that spoke of the desperate need for the Gospel message to be brought to the Chinese before they died "without God and without hope in the world".

The youngest missionary
When the Taylors were recruiting missionaries to go with them back to China, Faulding volunteered to accompany the 15 other candidates who were all as inexperienced as herself. She was the junior member of the Lammermuir Party, the largest party of Protestant missionaries ever to sail to China in 1866, but she quickly proved herself useful.

Pioneering work among women
On the journey, they weathered two typhoons and a near shipwreck. Once in China, they donned Chinese clothes and ventured down the Grand Canal, looking for a place to settle down to mission work. It caused a scandal among the other Westerners in China to see a young single woman like Faulding adopt the Chinese dress, which was considered a compromise with an idolatrous culture. However, Taylor was undeterred in encouraging his missionaries to "adopt all things not sinful that were Chinese in order to save some".

In Hangzhou, Faulding proved the value of being an unmarried female, as her daily walks around the neighborhood gave her opportunities to be invited in by the Chinese women, who did not feel threatened as they might have by a foreign man.

After she had been in China for five years, she was given a furlough at the request of her parents. Taylor accompanied her home in 1871. She had keenly felt the loss of Maria Taylor, her friend and mentor, the year previously. On the way back to England, Hudson proposed marriage. She accepted on the condition of her parents' approval, which was not easily obtained. In November of the same year they were married. She became the stepmother to Taylor's four surviving children and a successor to Maria as the "Mother of the Mission". Together, they had two children of their own and adopted an orphaned daughter of a missionary.

Leading from the shadows
The news of the terrible Great North China Famine of 1877–78 in Shanxi Province motivated Faulding to go there with two single women as part of a relief team – when no men could be spared to accompany them on their journey and her husband could not go, himself. She began an orphanage in Taiyuan, and distributed aid to the starving people there.

Faulding worked alongside her husband until the end of her life. They traveled across the globe many times recruiting missionaries and visiting mission stations in China. She died of breast cancer in Les Chevalleyres, Switzerland in 1904. Hudson remained with her at the end of her life.

Quote

Chronology
Birth to First Time in China 1866
 Born in England to William Joseph & Harriet Faulding
 Sailed to China (via the Cape of Good Hope) aboard the Lammermuir with James Hudson Taylor 26 May 1866 from East India Docks, London, England
 Arrived in China aboard the Lammermuir 29 September 1866 in Shanghai, China
 Settled with the Lammermuir party December 1866 in 1 Xin Kai Long (New Lane), Hangzhou, Zhejiang, China

Furlough and marriage
 Sailed to Guangzhou on furlough with James Hudson Taylor aboard the MM Volga on 5 August 1871 in Shanghai, China
 Sailed to Marseilles via Saigon, Ceylon, Aden, Suez aboard the MM Ava after 5 August 1871 in Guangzhou, Guangdong, China
 Arrived in England 25 September 1871 in from Marseilles, France (via Paris to London)
 Married to James Hudson Taylor, 28 November 1871 in Regent's Park Chapel, London, England
 Moved 15 January 1872 to 6 Pyrland Road, Islington, London, England

Return to China
 Sailed to China aboard the M M Tigre with Hudson Taylor, 9 October 1872 in Marseilles, France (via Paris from London)
 M M Tigre arrived 28 November 1872 in Shanghai, China
 Baby son (twin) Taylor born 13 April 1873 in Nanjing, Jiangsu, China
 Baby daughter (twin) Taylor born 14 April 1873 in Nanjing, Jiangsu, China

Raising a family in England
 Sailed to England on furlough with Hudson Taylor, 30 August 1874
 Arrived 15 October 1874, England
 "Dai Cun-xin" Ernest Hamilton Taylor born 7 January 1875, 2 Pyrland Road, Islington, London
 Amy H. Taylor born 7 April 1876, Islington, London
 Mary Jane Bowyer Duncan adopted, before 25 December 1877, England

Pioneering work in China
 Sailed to China without Hudson for famine relief work 2 May 1878
 Led the advance of women missionaries to the far interior about September 1878 in Shanxi, China
 Arrival and reunion with Hudson Taylor, 8 May 1879 in Yantai (Cheefoo), Shandong, China
 Sailed to England 13 October 1880
 Reunion with Hudson 21 December 1890 in Shanghai, China
 Arrived with Hudson Taylor, March 1892 in Vancouver, British Columbia, Canada
 Sailed to England via Canada, 10 May 1892
 Arrived, 26 July 1892 in England
 Arrived aboard the RMS Germanic, 24 February 1894 in Ellis Island, New York
 Arrived with Hudson Taylor, 17 April 1894 in Shanghai, China
 Sailed to England after July 1894
 Left China for India with Hudson Taylor, February 1896
 Returned to China with Hudson Taylor, April 1896
 Sailed to Italy aboard the Oceania (M. M. Oceanien?) with Hudson Taylor, 2 May 1896
 Arrived at Brindisi, Italy and visited Germany en route to England, before 17 June 1896
 Arrived, 17 June 1896 in England
 Visited with Hudson Taylor in Switzerland c. July 1897
 Sailed to US with Hudson Taylor, 24 November 1897
 Arrived, 18 December 1897 in US
 Arrived, 15 January 1898 in Shanghai, China
 Conference with Hudson Taylor, 16 January 1899 in Chongquing, Sichuan, China
 Sailed to Australia with Hudson Taylor, 25 September 1899
 Sailed to New Zealand from Australia with Hudson Taylor, 5 January 1900
 Sailed to US from New Zealand with Hudson Taylor, 20 March 1900
 Arrived, 5 April 1900 in San Francisco, California, US
 Sailed to England from US, 9 June 1900
 Arrived, 19 June 1900 in England

Final years
 Retired with Hudson Taylor, after 19 June 1900 in Davos, Switzerland
 Died 31 July 1904, aged 60, in Les Chevalleyres, Switzerland
 Buried after 31 July 1904 at La Chiesaz church cemetery, near Vevey, Switzerland

References

Notes

Further reading
Historical Bibliography of the China Inland Mission
Phyllis Thompson 1982. Hodder & Stoughton and OMF. Each to Her Post: Six Women of the China Inland Mission. Chapter 2, "Successor to Maria - Jennie Hudson Taylor"

External links
Christian Biography Resources
The family of James Hudson Taylor Genealogy.com

1843 births
1904 deaths
Baptist missionaries in China
Clergy from London
British expatriates in China
British expatriates in Switzerland
English Baptist missionaries
Deaths from breast cancer
Female Christian missionaries
Deaths from cancer in Switzerland
British humanitarians
Jennie
19th-century Baptists
Alumni of the Home and Colonial Training College